Óscar Wladimir Rojas Giacomozzi (born November 15, 1958 in Purén) is a former football defender from Chile.

Career
Rojas mainly played for Colo-Colo. He represented Chile at the 1982 FIFA World Cup, wearing the number 17 jersey.

References

External links
 
 Weltfussball profile 

1958 births
Living people
People from Malleco Province
Chilean people of Italian descent
Chilean footballers
Chilean expatriate footballers
Chile international footballers
Association football defenders
Malleco Unido footballers
Deportes Concepción (Chile) footballers
Colo-Colo footballers
Club Puebla players
Unión Española footballers
Universidad de Chile footballers
Atlético Morelia players
Primera B de Chile players
Chilean Primera División players
Liga MX players
Chilean expatriate sportspeople in Mexico
Expatriate footballers in Mexico
1982 FIFA World Cup players